Bathurst Inlet is a rock on the surface of Aeolis Palus, between Peace Vallis and Aeolis Mons ("Mount Sharp"), in Gale crater on the planet Mars.  The rock was encountered by the Curiosity rover on the way from Bradbury Landing to Glenelg Intrigue on September 30, 2012 and was named after Bathurst Inlet, a deep inlet located along the northern coast of the Canadian mainland. The "approximate" site coordinates are: .
 
The NASA rover team had assessed the rock to be a suitable target for one of the first uses of Curiosity's contact instruments, the Mars Hand Lens Imager (MAHLI) and the Alpha particle X-ray spectrometer (APXS).  The rock is dark gray and seems to contain grains or crystals, if any at all, that are finer than Curiosity's cameras can resolve: less than 80 μm in size.

See also

 Aeolis quadrangle 
 Composition of Mars 
 Geology of Mars 
 List of rocks on Mars
 Timeline of Mars Science Laboratory

References

External links
Curiosity Rover - Official Site
NASA - Mars Exploration Program 
Volcanic rock classification

Aeolis quadrangle
Mars Science Laboratory
Rocks on Mars